Much Birch is a village and civil parish in Herefordshire, England, between Hereford and Ross-on-Wye.  The parish includes the settlements of Kings Thorn, Much Birch and parts of Wormelow.

The village extends for about  along the A49, a busy trunk road running from the border with South Wales to North West England.

The church of St Mary and St Thomas of Canterbury by Thomas Foster dates from 1837.  The chancel ceiling is painted with cherubs peeping over clouds.

References

External links

 

Villages in Herefordshire
Civil parishes in Herefordshire